Mishaal bin Saud bin Abdulaziz Al Rashid (1913 – 1931) was the eldest son of Fahda bint Asi bin Shuraim Al Shammari and Rashidi Emir Saud bin Abdulaziz Al Rashid. Mishaal was assassinated in 1931. Mishaal's half-brother from his mother was King Abdullah of Saudi Arabia. His step-father was King Abdulaziz, the first ruler of modern Saudi Arabia.

References

1913 births
1931 deaths
Mishaal
Murdered royalty
Sons of monarchs